is a retired Japanese hurdler. She reached the final of the 2010 Asian Games in the 100 metres hurdles. She was also the former Japanese university record holder (13.26 seconds, set in 2009) in the 100 metres hurdles.

Personal best

International competition

References

External links

Rena Joshita at JAAF 
Rena Joshita at Bennu  (archived)

1986 births
Living people
Japanese female hurdlers
Sportspeople from Kanagawa Prefecture
Athletes (track and field) at the 2010 Asian Games
Asian Games competitors for Japan
21st-century Japanese women